Fantagraphics (previously Fantagraphics Books) is an American publisher of alternative comics, classic comic strip anthologies, manga, magazines, graphic novels, and the erotic Eros Comix imprint.

History

Founding 

Fantagraphics was founded in 1976 by Gary Groth and Michael Catron in College Park, Maryland. The company took over an adzine named The Nostalgia Journal, which it renamed The Comics Journal.

As comics journalist (and former Fantagraphics employee) Michael Dean writes, "the publisher has alternated between flourishing and nearly perishing over the years." Kim Thompson joined the company in 1977, using his inheritance to keep the company afloat. (He soon became a co-owner.)

The company moved from Washington, D.C. to Stamford, Connecticut, to Los Angeles over its early years, before settling in Seattle in 1989.

Beginning in 1981 Fantagraphics (under its Redbeard imprint) published Amazing Heroes, a magazine which examined comics from a hobbyist's point of view, as another income stream to supplement The Comics Journal. Amazing Heroes ran for 204 issues (plus a number of specials and annuals), folding with its July 1992 issue.

Comics publisher 
Beginning in 1979, Fantagraphics began publishing comics, starting with Jay Disbrow's The Flames of Gyro. They gained wider recognition in 1982 by publishing the Hernandez brothers'  Love and Rockets, and moved on to such critically acclaimed and award-winning series as Acme Novelty Library, Eightball, and Hate.

The company moved operations to Greater Los Angeles in 1984.

Catron acted as Fantagraphics' co-publisher until 1985 (also handling advertising and circulation for The Comics Journal from 1982 to 1985), when he left the company.

The Kirby Award and the Harvey Award 
From 1985 to 1987, Fantagraphics coordinated and presented (through their magazine Amazing Heroes) The Jack Kirby Award for achievement in comic books, voted on by comic-book professionals. The Kirby Award was managed by Dave Olbrich, a Fantagraphics employee (and later publisher of Malibu Comics). In 1987, a dispute arose when Olbrich and Fantagraphics each claimed ownership of the awards.  A compromise was reached, and, starting in 1988, the Kirby Award was discontinued and two new awards were created: the Eisner Award, managed by Olbrich; and the Fantagraphics-managed Harvey Award, named for cartoonist Harvey Kurtzman.

Relocation to Seattle 
In 1989, Fantagraphics relocated from Los Angeles to its current location in the Maple Leaf neighborhood of Seattle, Washington.

In 1990, the publisher introduced Eros Comix, a lucrative line of erotic comics that provided a replacement  revenue stream for Amazing Heroes and which helped the company again avoid bankruptcy.

Longtime employee Eric Reynolds joined Fantagraphics in 1993, first as news editor for The Comics Journal from 1993, before moving to marketing and promotion in 1996. Groth and Thompson acknowledged Reynolds was key to the company's rise to profitability.

Tom Spurgeon, later known as the publisher of The Comics Reporter, was editor of The Comics Journal from 1994 to 1999.

Financial ups and downs 
In 1998, Fantagraphics was forced into a round of layoffs; and in 2003 the company almost went out of business, losing over $60,000 in the wake of the 2002 bankruptcy of debtor and book trade distributor Seven Hills Distribution. One employee quit during the subsequent downsizing while denouncing Fantagraphics' "disorganization and poor management." Fantagraphics was saved by a restructuring and a successful appeal to comic book fandom that resulted in a huge number of orders. After restructuring, the company has had greater success with such hardcover collections as The Complete Peanuts, distributed by W. W. Norton & Company.

In 2009, Fantagraphics ceased publishing the print edition of The Comics Journal, shifting from an eight-times a year publishing schedule to a larger, more elaborate, semi-annual format supported by a new website.

European line 
Starting in 2005, Fantagraphics began a European graphic novel line, starting with the co-publication of the Ignatz Series, edited and produced by the Italian artist Igort. The publisher announced a deal with Jacques Tardi in March 2009 that would see co-publisher Thompson translate a large number of his books.

New challenges 

In 2006, Fantagraphics opened its own retail store, Fantagraphics Bookstore & Gallery, in Seattle's Georgetown neighborhood.

In early 2012, Michael Catron returned to Fantagraphics as editor with the company he had co-founded 36 years earlier.

Co-publisher Kim Thompson left Fantagraphics due to illness in March 2013, and died of lung cancer a few months later. His absence left the company without a number of titles it had been counting on for the summer and fall of 2013; and, in November, Fantagraphics started a Kickstarter campaign to raise $150,000, which it surpassed in four days.

In August 2020 the company rebranded, from Fantagraphics Books to just Fantagraphics, to reflect its status as a digital publisher also. At the same time it introduced a more compact logo featuring a stylized ink pen nib and a torch.

Imprints

Ignatz series
The Ignatz series is an international comic imprint. It is published by Fantagraphics (U.S.), Avant Verlag (Germany), Vertige Graphic (France), Oog & Blik (Holland), Coconino Press (Italy), and Sinsentido (Spain). It is named for Ignatz Mouse, a character in the comic strip Krazy Kat.

The books in the Ignatz series are designed midway between standard North American comic book pamphlet-size and graphic novel-size. Each title is 32 pages, two-color, saddle stitched, 8″ × 11″, with jacket, priced at $7.95.

The Ignatz collection is edited and produced by Italian artist Igort. Fantagraphics editor Kim Thompson frequently provided translations.

Eros Comix

Eros Comix is an adult-oriented imprint of Fantagraphics, established in 1990 to publish pornographic comic books. Eros Comix sells anime videos, DVDs, adult comic books, and books of erotic art and photography. The 2006 Eros Comix print catalog sold over 470 items, including adult comic books and humorous cheesecake-style comics often featuring pin-up girls like Bettie Page.

Writer-artist Tom Sutton contributed work to Eros titles under the pseudonym "Dementia".

Titles

Comics anthology magazines
Anything Goes!
BLAB!
Blood Orange
Critters
Ganzfeld
Graphic Story Monthly
Hotwire Comix and Capers
MOME
NOW
Pictopia
Prime Cuts
Snake Eyes
Zero Zero

Magazines
Amazing Heroes (1981–1992) – a defunct publication devoted mostly to mainstream comics
The Comics Journal (1977–present) – magazine of comics news and criticism
Honk (1986–1987) – magazine of comics news and criticism
Nemo, the Classic Comics Library (1983–1990) – a defunct magazine devoted to classic comics

Comic book series

Acme Novelty Library
Artbabe
The Adventures of Captain Jack
Angry Youth Comix
Big Mouth
The Biologic Show
Black Hole
Castle Waiting
Crap
Cud
Dalgoda
Doofus
Duplex Planet Illustrated
Eightball
The Eye of Mongombo
Evil Eye
Fission Chicken
Frank
Ganges
Good Girls
Grit Bath
Hate
Hip Hop Family Tree Vol. 1-4 by Ed Piskor
Jim
Jizz
Journey
La Perdida
Love and Rockets
Meatcake
Mechanics (Three-issue miniseries)
Megahex
Naughty Bits
Neat Stuff
The Nimrod
Raisin Pie
Real Stuff
Schizo
Shadowland
Stinz
The Stuff of Dreams
Unsupervised Existence
Uptight
Usagi Yojimbo (up to volume 7)
Tales Designed to Thrizzle
Wandering Son
Weasel
Whot Not!
Wuvable Oaf

# series

 0: Babel #1 by David B. [France]
 Baobab #1 by Igort [Italy]
 Insomnia #1 by Matt Broersma [U.K./U.S.A.]
 Wish You Were Here #1: The Innocents by Gipi [Italy]
 Interiorae #1 by Gabriella Giandelli [Italy]
 Ganges #1 by Kevin Huizenga [U.S.A.]
 Chimera #1 by Lorenzo Mattotti [Italy]
 Insomnia #2 by Matt Broersma [U.K./U.S.A.]
 Babel #2 by David B. [France]
 Wish You Were Here #2: They Found the Car by Gipi [Italy]
 Reflections #1 by Marco Corona [Italy]
 Baobab #2 by Igort [Italy]
 Niger #1 by Leila Marzocchi [Italy]
 Delphine #1 by Richard Sala [U.S.]
 New Tales of Old Palomar #1 by Gilbert Hernandez [U.S.]
 Interiorae #2 by Gabriella Giandelli [Italy]
 Calvario Hills #1 by Marti [Spain]
 The End #1 by Anders Nilsen [U.S.]
 Reflections #2 by Marco Corona [Italy]
 New Tales of Old Palomar #2 by Gilbert Hernandez [U.S.]
 Delphine #2 by Richard Sala [U.S.]
 Sammy the Mouse #1 by Zak Sally [U.S.]
 Grotesque #1 by Sergio Ponchione [Italy]
 Niger #2 by Leila Marzocchi [Italy]
 Reflections #3 by Marco Corona [Italy]
 Insomnia #3 by Matt Broersma [U.K./U.S.A.]
 New Tales of Old Palomar #3 by Gilbert Hernandez [U.S.]
 Ganges #2 by Kevin Huizenga [U.S.]
 Baobab #3 by Igort [Italy]
 Delphine #3 by Richard Sala [U.S.]
 Grotesque #2 by Sergio Ponchione [Italy]
 Interiorae #3 by Gabriella Giandelli [Italy]
 Sammy the Mouse #2 by Zak Sally [U.S.]
 Grotesque #3 by Sergio Ponchione [Italy]
 Delphine #4 by Richard Sala [U.S.]
 Ganges #3 by Kevin Huizenga [U.S.]
 Niger #3 by Leila Marzocchi [Italy]
 Grotesque #4 by Sergio Ponchione [Italy]
 Interiorae #4 by Gabriella Giandelli [Italy]
 Sammy the Mouse #3 by Zak Sally [U.S.]
 Ganges #4 by Kevin Huizenga [U.S.]

To be released:

XX: Babel #3 by David B.
XX: Baobab #4 by Igort [Italy]
XX: Calvario Hills #2 by Marti
XX: The End #2 by Anders Nilsen
XX: Wish You Were Here #3 by Gipi [Italy]

Graphic novels

King by Ho Che Anderson
Pixy by Max Andersson
Ghost World by Dan Clowes
Caricature by Dan Clowes
Like a Velvet Glove Cast in Iron by Dan Clowes
Patience by Dan Clowes
Beasts by Jacob Covey
My Favorite Thing Is Monsters by Emil Ferris
Drawn to Berlin by Ali Fitzgerald
The Wipeout by Francesca Ghermandi
Black is the Color by Julia Gfrörer
Laid Waste by Julia Gfrörer
Amsterdam by Simon Hanselmann
Megahex by Simon Hanselmann
One More Year by Simon Hanselmann
Palomar by Gilbert Hernandez
Locas by Jaime Hernandez
I Killed Adolf Hitler by Jason
The Lie and How We Told It by Tommi Parrish
Anywhere But Here by Miki Tori
Palestine by Joe Sacco
Safe Area Goražde by Joe Sacco
Harum Scarum by Lewis Trondheim
The Hoodoodad by Lewis Trondheim
Alphabetical Ballad of Carnality by David Sandlin
Weathercraft, Congress of the Animals, and Fran by Jim Woodring
Frederick and Eloise: A Love Story by Brian Biggs

Classic comics compilations

Disney comics
The Complete Carl Barks Disney Library
Disney Masters
The Don Rosa Library
Walt Disney's Mickey Mouse
Walt Disney's Uncle Scrooge & Donald Duck: Bear Mountain Tales
Walt Disney's Silly Symphonies

Other titles

Barnaby
Buz Sawyer
Captain Easy
The Complete Crumb Comics
Dennis the Menace
The EC Artists' Library
Feiffer: The Collected Works
Humbug
Krazy Kat
Little Nemo

Little Orphan Annie
Nancy
The Complete Peanuts
Pogo: The Complete Syndicated Comic Strips
Poor Arnold's Almanac
The Complete E. C. Segar Popeye
Powerhouse Pepper
Prince Valiant
Sam's Strip

Books
Black Images in the Comics: A Visual History by Fredrik Strömberg
Blacklight: The World of L.B. Cole by Bill Schelly
Film Noir 101: The 101 Best Film Noir Posters from the 1940s & 1950s by Mark Fertig
Laura Warholic by Alexander Theroux, 2007
Massive: Gay Erotic Manga and the Men Who Make It edited by Anne Ishii, Chip Kidd, and Graham Kolbeins
No Straight Lines edited by Justin Hall
 Significant Objects edited by Joshua Glenn and Rob Walker
Tales of Terror! The EC Companion by Grant Geissman and Fred von Bernewitz
Take That, Adolf! The Fighting Comic Books of the Second World War by Mark Fertig

Eros Comix titles

Adult Frankenstein by Enrico Teodorani
Aunts in your Pants by Enrico Teodorani
Birdland by Gilbert Hernandez
Elizabeth Bathory by Raulo Cáceres
Ironwood by Bill Willingham
Karate Girl

Omaha the Cat Dancer by Kate Worley (story) and Reed Waller (art)
Ramba by Rossi, Delizia, and Laurenti, whose protagonist is an erotic Italian hitlady
Small Favors by Colleen Coover
Sticky by Dale Lazarov and Steve MacIsaac
Submit! by Silvano & Enrico Teodorani
Tales from the Clit by Enrico Teodorani

Tijuana Bibles
Untamed Love by Frank Frazetta
Vladrushka and Rosa & Annalisa by JLRoberson
Wendy Whitebread by Don Simpson
Wheela, Biker Bitch of the Apocalypse by Enrico Teodorani

MangErotica titles

Bondage Fairies (1996)
Hot Tails (1996)
Spunky Knight (1996)
Super Taboo (1996)
Secret Plot (1997)
Countdown: Sex Bomb (1997)
Misty Girl Extreme (1997)
Secret Plot Deep (1998)
Silky Whip by Oh! great (1998)
New Bondage Fairies: Fairie Fetish (1998)
Co-ed Sexxtacy (1999)
Slut Girl (2000)
Pink Sniper by Kengo Yonekura (2006)
Domin-8 Me! by Sesshu Takemura (2007, original title: Take On Me)
Milk Mama by Yukiyanagi (2008)
Love Selection by Gunma Kisaragi (2010)
Too Hot to Handle by Jogi Tsukino (2010, original title: ♭37 °C)
Love & Hate by Enomoto Heights (2011)
A Strange Kind of Woman by Inu (2011)

Recognition

Kirby Awards

1986
 Best Black-and-White Comic: Love and Rockets, by Jaime Hernandez and Gilbert Hernandez

Note: In 1988, the Kirby Awards was disbanded and replaced by the Harvey and the Eisner Awards.

Eisner Awards 
List of won Eisner Awards:

1994
 Best Archival Collection: Complete Little Nemo in Slumberland Vol. 6 by Winsor McCay

1995
 Best Publication Design: The Acme Novelty Library, designed by Chris Ware

1996
 Best Continuing Series: Acme Novelty Library, by Chris Ware
 Best Archival Collection: The Complete Crumb Comics Vol. 11, by Robert Crumb
 Best Coloring: Chris Ware - The Acme Novelty Library
 Best Comics-Related Publication - Periodical: The Comics Journal
 Best Publication Design: The Acme Novelty Library by Chris Ware

1997
 Best Comics-Related Periodical: The Comics Journal
 Best Publication Design: Acme Novelty Library Vol. 7

1998
 Best Coloring: Chris Ware, The Acme Novelty Library
 Best Comics-Related Periodical: The Comics Journal
 Best Comics-Related Product: Acme Novelty Library display stand, designed by Chris Ware

1999
 Best Comics-Related Periodical: The Comics Journal

2000
 Best Continuing Series: Acme Novelty Library by Chris Ware
 Best Graphic Album - New: Acme Novelty Library Vol. 13, by Chris Ware
 Best Writer/Artist: Dan Clowes, Eightball

2001
 Best Writer/Artist - Humor: Tony Millionaire, Maakies
 Best Coloring: Chris Ware, Acme Novelty Library #14

2002
 Best Single Issue: Eightball #22, by Dan Clowes
 Best Writer/Artist: Dan Clowes, Eightball
 Best Publication Design: Acme Novelty Library #15, designed by Chris Ware

2003
 Best Single Issue or One-Shot: The Stuff of Dreams by Kim Deitch
 Best Archival Collection/Project: Krazy & Ignatz by George Herriman
 Best Writer/Artist- Humor: Tony Millionaire, The House at Maakies Corner
 Best Comics-Related Publication (Periodical or Book): B. Krigstein Vol. 1, by Greg Sadowski

2004
 Best Archival Collection/Project: Krazy & Ignatz: 1929–1930, by George Herriman, edited by Bill Blackbeard

2005
 Best Single Issue or One-Shot: Eightball #23: "The Death Ray", by Dan Clowes
 Best Archival Collection/Project: The Complete Peanuts edited by Gary Groth
 Best Publication Design: The Complete Peanuts, designed by Seth

2007
 Best Archival Collection/Project - Strips: The Complete Peanuts 1959–1960, 1961–1962, by Charles Schulz
 Best U.S. Edition of International Material: The Left Bank Gang by Jason
 Best Writer/Artist-Humor: Tony Millionaire, Billy Hazelnuts

2008
 Best Archival Collection/Project - Comic Books: I Shall Destroy All the Civilized Planets!, by Fletcher Hanks
 Best U.S. Edition of International Material: I Killed Adolf Hitler by Jason

2009
 Best U.S. Edition of International Material:The Last Musketeer by Jason

2011
 Best Reality-Based Work: It Was the War of the Trenches by Jacques Tardi
 Best U.S. Edition of International Material: It Was the War of the Trenches by Jacques Tardi

2012
 Best Archival Collection/Project-Comic Strips: Walt Disney's Mickey Mouse Vols. 1-2, by Floyd Gottfredson, edited by David Gerstein and Gary Groth

2013
 Best Short Story: Moon1969: The True Story of the 1969 Moon Launch,by Michael Kupperman, in Tales Designed to Thrizzle #8
 Best Archival Collection/Project-Strips: Pogo Vol. 2: Bona Fide Balderdash, by Walt Kelly, edited by Carolyn Kelly and Kim Thompson

2014
 Best Short Story: Untitled by Gilbert Hernandez, in Love and Rockets: New Stories #6
 Best U.S. Edition of International Material: Goddam This War!,by Jacques Tardi and Jean-Pierre Verney
 Best Writer/Artist: Jamie Hernandez, Love and Rockets: New Stories #6

2015
 Best Reality-Based Work: Hip Hop Family Tree Vol. 2 by Ed Piskor

2016
 Best Archival Collection/Project - Strips: The Eternaut, by Héctor Germán Oesterheld and Francisco Solana Lopez, edited by Gary Groth and Kristy Valenti
 Best Writer/Artist: Bill Griffith, Invisible Ink: My Mother's Secret Love Affair with a Famous Cartoonist

2017
 Best Archival Collection/Project - Comic Books (at least 20 years old): The Complete Wimmen's Comix, edited by Trina Robbins, Gary Groth and J. Michael Catron

2018
 Best Graphic Album- New: My Favorite Thing Is Monsters by Emil Ferris
 Best U.S. Edition of International Material: Run for It: Stories of Slaves Who Fought for the Freedom,by Marcelo D'Salete, translated by Andrea Rosenberg
 Best Writer/Artist: Emil Ferris, My Favorite Thing Is Monsters
 Best Coloring: Emil Ferris My Favorite Thing Is Monsters
 Best Comics-Related Periodical/Journalism: The Comics Journal, edited by Dan Nadel, Timothy Hodler and Tucker Stone, www.tcj.com
 Best Comics-Related Book: How to Read Nancy: The Elements of Comics in Three Easy Panels, by Paul Karasik and Mark Newgarden

Harvey Awards 
List of won Harvey Awards:

1989
 Best Writer: Gilbert Hernandez - Love and Rockets
 Best Continuing or Limited Series: Love and Rockets by Jaime and Gilbert Hernandez
 Best Domestic Reprint Project: The Complete Crumb Comics, by Robert Crumb

1990
 Best Writer: Gilbert Hernandez - Love and Rockets
 Best New Series: Eightball by Dan Clowes
 Best Continuing or Limited Series: Love and Rockets by Jaime and Gilbert Hernandez
 Best Single Issue or Story: Eightball #1, by Dan Clowes
 Best Biographical, Historical, or Journalistic Presentation: The Comics Journal, edited by Gary Groth
 Best Domestic Reprint Project: The Complete Little Nemo in Slumberland, by Winsor McCay

1991
 Best Cartoonist (writer/artist): Peter Bagge, Hate
 Best Letterer: Dan Clowes, Eightball
 Best New Series: Hate by Peter Bagge
 Best Continuing or Limited Series: Eightball by Dan Clowes
 Best Single Issue or Story: Eightball #3, by Dan Clowes
 Best Biographical, Historical, or Journalistic Presentation: The Comics Journal, edited by Gary Groth and Helena Harvilicz
 Best Domestic Reprint Project: The Complete Crumb Comics, by Robert Crumb
 Special Award Excellence in Presentation: The Complete Little Nemo in Slumberland, by Winsor McCay, edited by Richard Marschall, designed by Dale Crain

1992
 Best Inker:  Jaime Hernandez, Love and Rockets
 Best Continuing or Limited Series: Eightball by Dan Clowes, edited by Gary Groth
 Best Biographical, Historical, or Journalistic Presentation: The Comics Journal, edited by Gary Groth, Helena Harvilicz and Frank Young
 Best Domestic Reprint Project: The Complete Crumb Comics, by Robert Crumb
 Special Award Excellence in Presentation: The Complete Little Nemo in Slumberland, by Winsor McCay, edited by Richard Marschall, art directed by Dale Crain

1993
 Best Biographical, Historical, or Journalistic Presentation: The Comics Journal, edited by Gary Groth and Frank Young
 Best Domestic Reprint Project: The Complete Crumb Comics, by Robert Crumb

1994
 Best American Edition of Foreign Material: Billie Holiday by José Antonio Muñoz and Carlos Sampayo, edited by Gary Grot, Robert Boyd and Kim Thompson
 Best Domestic Reprint Project: The Complete Little Nemo In Slumberland Vol. 6 by Winsor McCay, edited by Bill Blackbeard, packaged by Dale Crain

1995
 Best New Series: Acme Novelty Library by Chris Ware, edited by Kim Thompson
 Best Domestic Reprint Project: The Complete Crumb Comics, by Robert Crumb, edited by Gary Groth and Robert Boyd, art direction by Mark Thompson
 Special Award Excellence in Presentation: Acme Novelty Library, by Chris Ware, edited by Kim Thompson

1996
 Best Letterer: Chris Ware, Acme Novelty Library
 Best Colorist: Chris Ware, Acme Novelty Library
 Best Domestic Reprint Project: The Complete Crumb Comics Vol. II, by Robert Crumb, edited by Mark Thompson
 Special Award Excellence in Presentation: Acme Novelty Library, by Chris Ware, edited by Kim Thompson, art directed by Chris Ware

1997
 Best Writer: Daniel Clowes, Eightball
 Best Letterer: Dan Clowes, Eightball
 Best Colorist: Chris Ware, Acme Novelty Library
 Best Continuing or Limited Series: Eightball by Dan Clowes, edited by Gary Groth
 Best Single Issue or Story: Acme Novelty Library #13, by Chris Ware
 Best Biographical, Historical, or Journalistic Presentation: The Comics Journal, edited by Gary Groth and Tom Spurgeon
 Special Award Excellence in Presentation: Acme Novelty Library, by Chris Ware, edited by Kim Thompson, art directed by Chris Ware

1998
 Best Colorist: Chris Ware, his body of work in 1997, including Acme Novelty Library
 Best New Series: Penny Century by Janime Hernandez, edited by Gary Groth
 Best Single Issue or Story:Eightball #18, by Dan Clowes, edited by Gary Groth
 Best Biographical, Historical, or Journalistic Presentation: The Comics Journal, edited by Gary Groth
 Special Award Excellence in Presentation: Acme Novelty Library, by Chris Ware, edited by Kim Thompson, art directed by Chris Ware

1999
 Best Artist or Penciller: Jaime Hernandez, his body of work in 1998, including Penny Century
 Best Inker: Charles Burns, Black Hole
 Best Single Issue or Story: Penny Century #3 "Home School", by Jaime Hernandez
 Best Biographical, Historical, or Journalistic Presentation: The Comics Journal, edited by Gary Groth and Tom Spurgeon
 Special Award Excellence in Presentation: Acme Novelty Library, by Chris Ware, edited by Kim Thompson, art directed by Chris Ware

2000
 Best Inker: Jaime Hernandez, Penny Century
 Best Letterer: Chris Ware, Acme Novelty Library
 Best Colorist: Chris Ware, Acme Novelty Library
 Best Cover Artist: Chris Ware, Acme Novelty Library
 Best New Series: Weasel by Dave Cooper, edited by Gary Groth
 Best Continuing or Limited Series: Acme Novelty Library by Chris Ware, edited by Kim Thompson
 Best Single Issue or Story: Acme Novelty Library #13 by Chris Ware
 Best Biographical, Historical, or Journalistic Presentation: The Comics Journal
 Special Award Excellence in Presentation: Acme Novelty Library #13 by Chris Ware

2001
 Best Artist or Penciller: Jaime Hernandez, Penny Century
 Best Inker: Charles Burns, Black Hole
 Best New Series: Luba's Comix and Stories by Gilbert Hernandez, edited by Gary Groth
 Best Continuing or Limited Series: Acme Novelty Library by Chris Ware, edited by Kim Thompson
 Best Biographical, Historical, or Journalistic Presentation: The Comics Journal

2002
 Best Cartoonist (writer/artist): Daniel Clowes, Eightball
 Best Inker: Charles Burns, Black Hole
 Best Letterer: Chris Ware, Acme Novelty Library
 Best Colorist: Chris Ware, Acme Novelty Library
 Best New Series: La Perida, by Jessica Abel
 Best Single Issue or Story: Eightball #22 by Dan Clowes

2003
 Best Inker: Jaime Hernandez, Love and Rockets
 Best Graphic Album of Previously Published Work: 20th Century Eightball by Daniel Clowes
 Best Anthology: Comics Journal Summer Special 2002
 Best Biographical, Historical, or Journalistic Presentation: B. Krigstein Vol. 1
 Best Domestic Reprint Project: Krazy and Ignatz
 Special Award Excellence in Presentation: Krazy and Ignatz, designed by Chris Ware

2004
 Best Inker: Charles Burns, Black Hole
 Best Cover Artist: Charles Burns, Black Hole
 Best Single Issue or Story: Love and Rockets #9 by Jamie and Gilbert Hernandez (tied with Gotham Central # 6-10 by Greg Rucka and Michael Lark)
 Best Domestic Reprint Project: Krazy and Ignatz by George Herriman, edited by Bill Blackbeard

2005
 Best Writer: Daniel Clowes - Eightball
 Best Inker: Charles Burns, Black Hole
 Best Single Issue or Story: Eightball #23 by Daniel Clowes - 2006, Love and Rockets (vol. 2) #15, by Hernandez
 Best Domestic Reprint Project: The Complete Peanuts 1950–1952 by Charles Schulz
 Special Award Excellence in Presentation: The Complete Peanuts 1950–1952, by Charles Schulz, designed by Seth

2006
 Best Inker: Charles Burns, Black Hole
 Best New Talent: R. Kikuo Johnson, Night Fisher (split award with tied Marvel Knights 4 by Roberto Aguirre-Sacasa)
 Best Biographical, Historical, or Journalistic Presentation: The Comics Journal, edited by Gary Groth

2007
Best Cartoonist (writer/artist): Jaime Hernandez, Love and Rockets
Best Domestic Reprint Project: The Complete Peanuts

2008
 Best Domestic Reprint Project: The Complete Peanuts

2009
 Best Domestic Reprint Project: The Complete Peanuts

2011
 Best Continuing or Limited Series: Love and Rockets Vol. 3 by Jaime and Gilbert Hernandez

2013
 Best Cartoonist (writer/artist): Jaime Hernandez, Love and Rockets

References

Notes

Sources consulted 
 Spurgeon, Tom with Michael Dean. Everything Was in Season': Fantagraphics from 1978–1984: Amazing Heroes", The Comics Journal (December 8, 2016).

External links

Fantagraphics Books at the Big Comic Book Database

 
Book publishing companies based in Seattle
Comic book publishing companies of the United States
Publishers of adult comics
American companies established in 1976
Publishing companies established in 1976
Fantagraphics Books
Disney comics publishers
1976 establishments in Maryland